Magnus Gustafsson was the defending champion, but did not compete this year.

Alberto Berasategui won the title by defeating Andrea Gaudenzi 7–5, 6–3, 7–6(7–5) in the final.

Seeds
All seeds received a bye into the second round.

Draw

Finals

Top half

Section 1

Section 2

Bottom half

Section 3

Section 4

References

External links
 Official results archive (ATP)
 Official results archive (ITF)

Singles 1994
Mercedes Cup Singles